Forkhead box protein J2 is a protein that in humans is encoded by the FOXJ2 gene.

References

Further reading

Forkhead transcription factors